Hiram W. Duncan was a state senator in South Carolina during the Reconstruction era.

He represented Union County, South Carolina in the South Carolina Senate.

He was succeeded in the state senate in November 1872 by Thomas Bothwell Jeter who went on to become governor.

References 

Year of birth missing
Year of death missing
Place of birth missing
Place of death missing
People from Union County, South Carolina
South Carolina state senators
19th-century American politicians